Inciting subversion of state power is a crime under the law of the People's Republic of China. It is article 105, paragraph 2 of the 1997 revision of the People's Republic of China's Penal Code.

The "inciting subversion" crime is related to earlier Chinese laws criminalizing activities deemed "counterrevolutionary"; as was the case with its predecessor, the charge is wielded by the government as an instrument of political repression. The Chinese government frequently uses "inciting subversion of state power" as a "catch-all" charge used to target and imprison political activists, human rights campaigners and dissidents. In 2009, prominent dissident and Nobel Peace Prize laureate Liu Xiaobo was sentenced to 11 years in prison for "incident subversion of state power" based on his drafting of the Charter 08 manifesto calling for political reform. A 2008 report by the Chinese Human Rights Defenders (CHRD) website lists 34 people convicted under this law, many of them for having posted articles on the internet that were critical of the government. The Chinese authorities have used the charge against Chinese human rights lawyers and activists in the 709 crackdown, which began in 2015. In 2019, Zhen Jianghua, a human rights activist and anti-censorship campaigner, was sentenced to two years in prison for "inciting subversion of state power"; later the same year, Wang Yi, the pastor of the Early Rain Covenant Church, a Chengdu-based house church (congregation operating outside of government control), was convicted and sentenced to nine years in prison in charges of "illegal business operation" and inciting subversion of state power.

Text of the law

Article 105, Paragraph 2, 1997 Criminal Code of the People's Republic of China (translation by Wei Luo):

"Anyone who uses rumour, slander or other means to encourage subversion of the political power of the State or to overthrow the socialist system, shall be sentenced to fixed-term imprisonment of not more than five years.  However, the ringleaders and anyone whose crime is monstrous shall be sentenced to fixed-term imprisonment of not less than five years."

1997 UN report
The United Nations' Working Group on Arbitrary Detention reported on the new law in its 1997 'country visit' to China. It predicted correctly that the vague language of the law would enable it to be used against the 'communication of thoughts or ideas'. A quote from the report:

See also

List of Chinese dissidents
Law of the People's Republic of China
Human rights in China
List of political offences that attract jail terms in China
Picking quarrels and provoking trouble
Anti-Soviet agitation

References

Chinese law
Political repression in China